Coal Creek is a rural locality in the Somerset Region, Queensland, Australia. In the  Coal Creek had a population of 52 people.

Geography 
The watercourse Coal Creek enters the locality from the west (Biarra) and then meanders through the south of the locality before exiting to the east. Once it was a tributary of the Brisbane River but now contributes directly into the upper reaches of Lake Wivenhoe created by the Wivenhoe Dam across the river.

History
The locality presumably takes its name from the creek.

Coal Creek Provisional School opened on 7 November 1892. On 1 January 1909 it became Coal Creek State School. It closed in 1948.

In the  Coal Creek had a population of 52 people. On average, each household in Coal Creek was inhabited by 2.1 people, compared to the national average of 2.6. 2016 was the first year in which the Australian census collected data specifically for Coal Creek.

Education 
There are no schools in Coal Creek. The nearest government primary school is Esk State School in neighbouring Esk to the south. The nearest government secondary school is Toogoolawah State High School in Toogoolawah to the north-west.

References 

Suburbs of Somerset Region
Localities in Queensland